Yajna Sri Satakarni (Brahmi: 𑀲𑀺𑀭𑀺 𑀬𑀜 𑀲𑀸𑀢𑀓𑀡𑀺 Siri Yaña Sātakaṇi), also known as Gautamiputra Yajna Sri, was an Indian ruler of the Satavahana dynasty. He was the brother of Vashishtiputra Satakarni. His reign is dated variously: c. 152-181 CE, c. 165-195 CE, c. 170-199 CE or c. 174-203.

He is considered to be the last great king of the Satavahana dynasty. He regained some of the territory lost to Shakas (the Western Satraps) under Vashishtiputra Satakarni. He defeated the Western Satraps and reconquered their southern regions in western and central India. The Satavahana started to decline after Yajna Sri Satakarni, while the Western Satraps would continue to prosper for another two centuries.

Coinage

Inscriptions
There are two inscriptions of Yajna Sri Satakarni at Kanheri, in cave No.81, and in the Chaitya cave No.3.

In Nasik Caves, Cave No.20 has one large inscription, claiming that the unfinished cave was completed  by the wife of a great general named Bhavagopa, during the 7th year of the rule of king Sri Yajna Satakarni, son of Gotami, after having been started by the ascetic Bopaki. 

These inscriptions show that the Satavahanas were in possession of the areas of Kanheri and Nasik during the reign of Sri Yajna Satakarni.

He is also known from his coins, and from the mention of his name in the regnal lists of the Matsya Purana, in which he is said to have ruled 29 years.

References

 "A Catalogue of Indian coins in the British Museum. Andhras etc..", Rapson

2nd-century Indian monarchs
Yajna

Book sources